James Lyons-Weiler (born July 4, 1967) is an American scientist and anti-vaccination activist who operates the non-profit organization Institute for Pure and Applied Knowledge. He has degrees in zoology, ecology, and conservation biology, and is a former University of Pittsburgh faculty member.

History 
Lyons-Weiler has made numerous false and misleading claims about COVID-19 and vaccines. United States Court of Federal Claims Special Master Christian J. Moran concluded in 2020 that Lyons-Weiler was "wholly unqualified to opine on the question of vaccine causation"; the decision related to a lawsuit in which Lyons-Weiler had testified claiming that a woman was injured as a result of the HPV vaccine. 

His February 2020 claim that SARS-CoV-2 contains a genetic sequence proving that the virus was probably engineered in a laboratory was discredited by researchers and fact-checkers.

References

External links

1967 births
Living people
American anti-vaccination activists
COVID-19 conspiracy theorists
University of Nevada, Reno alumni
University of Pittsburgh faculty
20th-century American zoologists